Shareek is a 2015 Punjabi musical drama film directed by Navaniat Singh, starring  Jimmy Sheirgill, Mahie Gill, Guggu Gill, Simar Gill, Oshin Sai, Mukul Dev, Kuljinder Sidhu, Prince KJ, Hobby Dhaliwal, Gulchoo Jolly. It is produced under the banner of Ohri Productions and Green Planet Production. It was first released on 22 October 2015.  Mukul Dev was awarded the PTC Punjabi film awards for best actor in a negative role for his performance in the movie.

Plot
Two families fight over land that belonged to their father/grandfather. Jassa and Surjit take care of the land that their grandfather gave to them. Their cousins are envious of them. One day, Pali and Dara murder Pavitar (Jassa & Surjeet's father). Jassa takes revenge by killing Pali. After killing Pali, his brother forces Jassa to leave India. Ekam leaves with his chacha. Jassa leaves Jassi, whom he loves. There is a ten-year leap. Agam marries Roohi. The land that had belonged to Jassa's father was put on trial. After some time, the court makes Agam the rightful owner of the land. Dara gets envious and hires a truck that hits Agam, causing him to die.  Jassa comes back to India after he finds out that his nephew was killed. Roohi is made the owner of the land. Dara makes a plan and asks Roohi's father if Roohi and his brother can get married. Roohi's father agreed. Ekam comes back to India and learns that his brother has passed away.the family asks him to marry Roohi, and he agrees. Jassa kills Dara, which causes him to go to prison. When he is released in 2015, his son, Zorawar kills him by shooting him in the head. (Zorawar is the son of Jassa and Jassi).

Cast
 Jimmy Sheirgill as Jassa Brar
 Mahie Gill as Jassi Brar (née Sidhu)
 Guggu Gill as Surjit Singh Brar
 Mukul Dev as Didar Singh 'Dara' Brar
 Simar Gill in a dual role as
Agam Brar 
Ekam Brar
 Prince Kanwaljit Singh Bant Brar
 Kuljinder Sidhu as Pali Brar
 Oshin Sai as Roohi
 Hobby Dhaliwal as Nachattar Singh Brar
 Gulchoo Jolly as Kulwant
 Gurveer Singh Saini
 Sahebveer Singh Saini

Music

The soundtrack of the album is composed by Jaidev Kumar with lyrics written by Kumaar, Davinder Khannewala, Happy Raikoti & Preet Harpal

Critical reception
Jasmine Singh of The Tribune reviewed the film as "a disjointed drama".

Sequel

The sequel to this 2015 film, titled Shareek 2 will hit the screens on 29 April 2022, under the banner of Ohri Productions, and White Hill Studios. The sequel stars Jimmy Sheirgill(Retained) and Dev Kharoud and will bring back Navaniat Singh as the director.

References

External links
 

2015 films
2010s musical drama films
Indian musical drama films
Films about dysfunctional families
Insurgency in Punjab in fiction
Punjabi-language Indian films
2010s Punjabi-language films
2015 drama films